Helio Batista dos Santos Junior (born 20 February 1973), or simply Helio Batista, is a former Brazilian football player.

External links
 

1973 births
Living people
Brazilian footballers
Clube Atlético Bragantino players
FC Spartak Vladikavkaz players
Russian Premier League players
Brazilian expatriate footballers
Expatriate footballers in Russia
Association football forwards